Iulio "Bunty" Afoa (born 20 August 1996) is a Samoa international rugby league footballer who plays as a  for the New Zealand Warriors in the NRL.

Background
Afoa was born in Auckland, New Zealand, and is of Samoan descent and attended St Paul's College. 

He played his junior rugby league for the Point Chevalier Pirates, before being signed by the New Zealand Warriors.

Playing career

Early career
From 2014 to 2016, Afoa Loni Lolohea played for the New Zealand Warriors' NYC team. In May 2015, he was selected as 18th man for the Junior Kiwis side to play the Junior Kangaroos. Afoa played in his 50th Holden Cup match in 2015 and was named the Junior Warriors player of the year at the end of the season.

2016
On 23 June, Afoa re-signed with the Warriors on a three-year contract until the end of 2019. In Round 17 of the 2016 NRL season, he made his NRL debut for the Warriors against the Gold Coast Titans. On 8 October, he made his international debut for Samoa in their historical test match against Fiji in Apia.

2017
In the 2017 NRL season, Afoa made 17 appearances as the club finished a disappointing 13th on the table.

2018
Afoa made 23 appearances for New Zealand in the 2018 NRL season as the club qualified for the finals for the first time since 2011.  Afoa played in the club's elimination final loss to Penrith.

2019
Afoa played 20 games for New Zealand in the 2019 NRL season as the club missed out on the finals.

2020
On 18 February, Afoa was ruled out for the entire 2020 NRL season after suffering an ACL injury at pre-season training.

2021
On 10 June, the New Zealand Warriors announced that Afoa had signed a new two-year contract.

2022
In round 13 of the 2022 NRL season, Afoa was sent to the sin bin for a professional foul and later scored a try in New Zealand's 44-12 loss against Manly.
Afoa made a total of 24 appearances for the New Zealand club as they finished 15th on the table.

References

External links

New Zealand Warriors profile
 Warriors profile
NRL profile
2017 RWLC profile

1996 births
Living people
New Zealand rugby league players
New Zealand sportspeople of Samoan descent
New Zealand Warriors players
Point Chevalier Pirates players
Rugby league props
Rugby league second-rows
People educated at St Paul's College, Auckland
Samoa national rugby league team players
Rugby league players from Auckland